Ziuzina is a populated place in Belarus. Not to be mistaken with Zyuzino, Russia.

See also
Polotsk

References

Populated places in Vitebsk Region
Villages in Belarus